Nazareth College, Alicante, is a work that was initiated by the Society of Jesus in 1957 to tend to the educational and other needs of at-risk youth and their families in the community of Alicante, Spain.

History
In September 1957, Jesuit Francisco Javier Fontova initiated Nazareth in response to the minors with problems of social marginalization in Alicante. He began by feeding 32 children, two of whom lived at the facility. The "Catholic Mothers" of the Marian Congregation helped with teaching the children.

By 1977 there were 190 boys aged 5 to 17 living in the boarding school, with 4 teachers.

See also
 List of Jesuit sites

References  

Jesuit secondary schools in Spain
Catholic schools in Spain
Educational institutions established in 1957
Jesuit development centres
1957 establishments in Spain